Evelyn Okere is a Nigerian businesswoman. She publishes a health and fashion magazine, St. Eve; is managing director of a health business, St. Eve Concepts; and has a fashion company, Rose di Omimi.

Early life

Okere attended University of Nigeria Nsukka, Enugu State, where she studied history.

Business career

Okere worked in banking, in the telecommunications industry and in the oil and gas industry. She started St. Eve in 2010.

In August 2012 her company brought the American rapper Rick Ross to the Summer Jam Fest concert in Lagos.

References 

Living people
University of Nigeria alumni
Year of birth missing (living people)
Place of birth missing (living people)